Kwonkan is a genus of Australian tarantulas first described by Barbara York Main in 1983. It was originally assigned to Dipluridae, but was later assigned to Nemesiidae due to similarities to the genus Aname, before being transferred to the family Anamidae in 2010. Yilgarnia is now considered a synonym for this genus, and its type species is assigned to Kwonkan currycomboides.

Species
 it contains nine species:

Kwonkan anatolion Main, 1983 – Australia (South Australia)
Kwonkan currycomboides (Main, 1986) – Australia (Western Australia)
Kwonkan eboracum Main, 1983 – Australia (Western Australia)
Kwonkan goongarriensis Main, 1983 – Australia (Western Australia)
Kwonkan linnaei (Main, 2008) – Australia (Western Australia)
Kwonkan moriartii Main, 1983 – Australia (Western Australia)
Kwonkan silvestris Main, 1983 – Australia (Western Australia)
Kwonkan turrigera (Main, 1994) – Australia (Western Australia, South Australia)
Kwonkan wonganensis (Main, 1977) – Australia (Western Australia)

References

Anamidae
Mygalomorphae genera
Spiders of Australia